In 1938, after the destruction to Fire Island from the Long Island Express hurricane, Robert Moses and W. Earle Andrews, both part of the Long Island State Park Commission, proposed reconstruction of the island. This proposal included an extension of the Ocean Parkway out from its terminus at Captree State Park across Fire Island to Westhampton. The new spur at Ponquogue, deemed the Ponquogue Parkway, would have marked the eastern terminus of the new Ocean Parkway extension. The proposal lived until the cut-back to Smith Point County Park in 1962 for environmental issues with such a construction, ending any proposal for a parkway in the area of Hampton Bays.

History
After the destruction caused to Fire Island because of the 1938 Long Island Express hurricane, Robert Moses, director of the Long Island State Park Commission (LISPC) proposed reconstruction of Fire Island to restrain future damage from other natural disasters. The $9.3 million proposal, designed by Moses and W. Earle Andrews, would bring  of sand to bolster Fire Island. This sand would create a complete fill from Fire Island Inlet to the United States Coast Guard station at Shinnecock. Sand would also be dredged from the Great South Bay, Moriches Bay and Shinnecock Bay to boost the effort of shoring Fire Island.

In the need for these new parkways, Moses and Andrews also proposed two parkway spurs across the Great South Bay and Shinnecock Bay. These parkway spurs, which would use bascule lift bridges, were to connect to the William Floyd Parkway (current-day CR 46) and Ponquogue Avenue (current-day CR 32), which would cross their respective bodies of water and terminate at a junction with Montauk Highway (NY 27A) in Shirley and Hampton Bays. Deemed locally as the Ponquogue Parkway, but also considered an extension of the Ocean Parkway, the new  parkway proposal would also bring forth three new parks into the New York State Parks system: Smith Point (replacing the current-day Smith Point County Park), Point O'Woods (in the namesake community) and Quogue. Fire Island State Park would also be rebuilt. Within that year, Andrews sliced over $6 million off of the project, eliminating a bridge over Fire Island Inlet along with the state parks at Quogue and Point O'Woods. The other 1938 change would be a new turnoff in Hampton Bays rather than construction out to Southampton and NY 27A. This money would be paid for by Suffolk Count and by a grant from the Public Works Administration.

This proposal was opposed to by locals due to its costs in 1938, but raised again in 1944 by Moses due to the belief that no storms would ever hit the area again. In 1962, Moses brought, with support of a 15-member commission that approved a $137 million (1962 USD) shoreline plan from Tottenville, Staten Island to Montauk, a truncated proposal that would extend the Ocean Parkway across most of Fire Island to a junction in Smith Point County Park rather than all the way out to Shinnecock. Residents of Fire Island argued that the time it would take to construct the new parkway would take too long and should invest in a temporary solution for protection of the island. At that time, the group funding the project stated that all it would need to construct this new parkway was approval of the New York State Legislature. Suffolk County and the state also intended to withhold funds from any project that did not have the parkway extension.

Exit list for proposed parkway

References

External links
 Unbuilt Ponquogue Causeway @ NYCROADS.com
 Ocean Parkway @ NYCROADS.com

Roads on Long Island
Transportation in Suffolk County, New York
Cancelled highway projects in the United States
Robert Moses projects
Parkways in New York (state)
Southampton (town), New York